The Paranoá River is a river in the Federal District, Brazil. It flows into São Bartolomeu River which then joins the larger Corumbá River.

See also
List of rivers in the Federal District

References
Brazilian Ministry of Transport

Rivers of Federal District (Brazil)